Arctostaphylos mewukka is a species of manzanita known by the common name Indian manzanita.

Description
Arctostaphylos mewukka is a mostly hairless shrub growing to heights between 1 and 4 meters, with or without a burl at the base. Leaves are variable in shape, from nearly round to widely lance-shaped, up to 7 centimeters long, and dull, smooth, and sometimes waxy in texture. The inflorescence is a loose cluster of urn-shaped manzanita flowers. The fruit is a dark reddish-brown spherical drupe up to 1.6 centimeters wide.

Distribution and habitat
Arctostaphylos mewukka is endemic to the Sierra Nevada of California, where it grows in the mountain chaparral in the temperate coniferous forests of the range.

References

External links

Jepson Manual Treatment:  Arctostaphylos mewukka
USDA Plants Profile
Arctostaphylos mewukka Photo gallery

mewukka
Endemic flora of California
Flora of the Sierra Nevada (United States)
Natural history of the California chaparral and woodlands
Plants described in 1918
Flora without expected TNC conservation status